Pon. Raja is an Indian politician and was a member of the 14th Tamil Nadu Legislative Assembly from the Ponneri constituency, which is reserved for candidates from the Scheduled Castes. He represented the All India Anna Dravida Munnetra Kazhagam party.

The elections of 2016 resulted in his constituency being won by P. Balaraman.

Electoral performance

References 

Tamil Nadu MLAs 2011–2016
All India Anna Dravida Munnetra Kazhagam politicians
Living people
Year of birth missing (living people)
Amma Makkal Munnetra Kazhagam politicians